Methyl diethanolamine, also known as N-methyl diethanolamine and more commonly as MDEA, is the organic compound with the formula CH3N(C2H4OH)2. It is a colorless liquid with an ammonia odor. It is miscible with water, ethanol and benzene. A tertiary amine, it is widely used as a sweetening agent in chemical, oil refinery, syngas production and natural gas.

Similar compounds are monoethanolamine (MEA), a primary amine, and diethanolamine (DEA), a secondary amine, both of which are also used for amine gas treating. MDEA's defining characteristic when compared to these other amines is its ability to preferentially remove H2S (and strip CO2) from sour gas streams.

MDEA's popularity as a solvent for gas treating stems from several advantages it has when compared to other alkanolamines. One of these advantages is a low vapor pressure, which allows for high amine compositions without appreciable losses through the absorber and regenerator. MDEA is also resistant to thermal and chemical degradation and is largely immiscible with hydrocarbons. MDEA is a common base note in perfumes to allow the fragrance to last. Lastly, MDEA has a relatively low heat of reaction with hydrogen sulfide and carbon dioxide, which allows for lower reboiler duties, thus lower operating costs.

MDEA blends

MDEA is less reactive towards CO2, but has an equilibrium loading capacity approaching 1 mole CO2 per mole amine. It also requires less energy to regenerate. To combine the advantages of MDEA and the smaller amines, MDEA is usually mixed with a catalytic promoter such as piperazine, PZ, or a fast reacting amine such as MEA to retain reactivity, but lower regeneration costs. Activated MDEA or aMDEA uses piperazine as a catalyst to increase the speed of the reaction with CO2. It has been commercially successful. Many tests have been done on the performance of MDEA/MEA or MDEA/piperazine mixtures compared to single amines. CO2 production rates were higher than MEA for the same heat duty and total molar concentration when experiments were performed in the University of Regina pilot plant, which is a modeled after a natural gas plant. There were also insignificant trace amounts of degradation products detected. However, when the same control variables and tests were conducted at the Boundary Dam Power Station plant, the CO2 production rate for the mixed solvent was lower than MEA. This was a result of the reduction in the capacity of the solvent to absorb CO2 after degradation. Because the Boundary Dam plant is a coal-fired power plant, it operates under harsher environments and produces an impure flue gas containing, fly ash, SO2, and NO2 that are fed into carbon capture. Even with flue gas pretreatment, there is still enough to produce degradation products such as 
straight chain amines and sulfur compounds, which accumulate so it is no longer possible to regenerate MEA and MDEA. For these blends to be successful in reducing heat duty, their chemical stabilities must be maintained.

Degradation

Main oxidative degradation products of MDEA include monoethanol amine (MEA), methyl-aminoethanol (MAE), diethanolamine (DEA), amino acids bicine, glycine and hydroxyethyl sarcosine (HES), formyl amides of MAE and DEA, ammonia, and stable salts formate, glycolate, acetate, and oxalate. In an industrial plan that utilizes MDEA, oxidative degradation is most likely to shift to the cross exchanger where temperatures are greater than 70 °C. Higher temperatures and higher CO2 loading accelerate the rate of degradation, resulting in an increase of alkalinity loss as well as total formate production. While MDEA is more resistant to degradation as a standalone compared to MEA, MDEA is preferentially degraded when in an MDEA/MEA blend. Because of the formation of DEA and MAE, which could form nitroso-compounds or diethylnitrosamine and diethylnitraine, the blend could potentially have an adverse impact in terms of atmospheric admissions. In the Boundary Dam plant, emissions increased when CO2 loading of lean amine increased for the blend and MEA. However, decreasing the lean loading increases the reboiler heat duty, which results in an obvious tradeoff between emissions and heat duty or energy costs.

This compound should not be confused with the recreational drug methylenedioxyethylamphetamine which is also abbreviated MDEA.

Production
MDEA is produced by ethoxylation of methylamine using ethylene oxide:
CH3NH2  +  2 C2H4O   →   CH3N(C2H4OH)2
Another route involves hydroxymethylation of diethanolamine followed by hydrogenolysis.

See also
 Amine gas treating

References

 The GPSA Databook

Amines
Diols